is a town located in Hiyama Subprefecture, Hokkaido, Japan.

As of September 2016, the town had an estimated population of 5,161, and a density of 9.4 per km2. The total area is 547.58 km2.

Geography
Kaminokuni is located on the southwest of the Oshima Peninsula and faces the Sea of Japan. Amano River flows through the central town. Esashi Line used to run along this river.

Neighboring towns
 Hiyama Subprefecture
 Esashi
 Assabu
 Oshima Subprefecture
 Kikonai
 Shiriuchi
 Matsumae
 Fukushima

History
Strongman Takeda Nobuhiro (1431-1494), progenitor of the Kakizaki (later Matsumae) house, established a fort (tate) in Kaminokuni leading to the settlement of the area by other Wajin merchants and fishermen.
1879: The village of Kaminokuni was founded.
1902: Kaminokuni Village was merged with neighboring villages to form the new village of Kaminokuni.
1967: Kaminokuni Village became Kaminokuni Town.

Education
 High school
 Hokkaido Kaminokuni High School
 Junior high school
 Kaminokuni Junior High School (上ノ国中学校)
 Elementary school
 Kaminokuni Elementary School (上ノ国小学校)
 Kahoku Elementary School (河北小学校)
 Takisawa Elementary School (滝沢小学校)

Sister cities
  Goshogawara, Aomori
  Omihachiman, Shiga

Notable people from Kaminokuni
Tatsuhiko Takimoto, author

References

External links

Official Website 

Towns in Hokkaido